Maine School Administrative District 53 (MSAD 53) is an operating school district within Maine, covering the towns of Burnham, Detroit and Pittsfield.

References 

53
53
53
Pittsfield, Maine